Disilyne is a silicon hydride with the formula .  Several isomers are possible, but none are sufficiently stable to be of practical value.  Substituted disilynes contain a formal silicon–silicon triple bond and as such are sometimes written R2Si2 (where R is a substituent group). They are the silicon analogues of alkynes.

The term silyne has two diverse meanings. Some chemists use it to refer to compounds containing a silicon–silicon triple bond, whereas others use the term to refer to compounds containing a silicon–carbon triple bond by analogy to silene, which often refers to compounds containing silicon–carbon double bonds. The term polysilyne can refer to the layer polymer (SiH)n or substituted derivatives.

Substituted disilynes 

The first example isolated and characterised by X-ray crystallography is an emerald green crystalline compound reported in 2004.
This molecule has the formula R'_2R''Si-Si#Si-SiR''R'_2, where R' = HC(SiMe3)2 and R'' = HCMe2.

It was prepared by the reduction of the related tetrabrominated precursor by potassium graphite (KC8). It is air- and moisture-sensitive but is a stable solid up to 128 °C.

The geometry of the central four-silicon chain is unlike that of analogous carbon structures. Whereas substituted alkynes are linear, having a 180° bond angle at each end of the carbon–carbon triple bond, the silicon chain is bent to 137° at each end. The four silicon atoms in the  chain are however perfectly coplanar, with the first and fourth silicon atoms trans to one another. The central triple bond length is 206 pm, which is around 4% shorter than the typical bond-length of Si–Si double bonds (214 pm)) and the Si–Si single bonds are 237 pm.  The  colour is attributed to a weak π–π* transition.

Calculations show a bond order of 2.6. An alternative calculation of the bond order by a different group describes the bonding as essentially due to only two electron pairs, with the third pair in a non-bonding orbital. Reaction of this compound with phenylacetylene produced a 1,2 disilabenzene.
Other workers 
have also reported another related compound which contains a hexasila-3-yne chain:
R3Si(SiR3)SiMeSi2SiMe(SiR3)SiR3
where Me = methyl and R = t-butyl
In this compound, the Si–Si triple bond length was calculated as 207 pm.

Heavier group 14 analogues
Triple bonded compounds of the heavier members of group 14 have also been prepared; lead,
 and tin and germanium (digermyne) The cores of the disilyne, digermyne, distannyne, and diplumbyne have similarly bent geometries.  These findings are generally consistent with the absence of conventional triple bonds.

See also
Disilane
Disilene
Organosilicon compounds

References

Silicon hydrides